Calotarsa is a genus of flat-footed flies (insects in the family Platypezidae). There are about six described species in Calotarsa.

Species
These six species belong to the genus Calotarsa:
 Calotarsa calceata (Snow, 1894) i c g
 Calotarsa durangoensis Kessel & Young, 1974 c g
 Calotarsa insignis Aldrich, 1906 i c g b
 Calotarsa mexicana Kessel & Young, 1974 c g
 Calotarsa pallipes (Loew, 1866) i c g b
 Calotarsa simplex Kessel, 1974 i c g
Data sources: i = ITIS, c = Catalogue of Life, g = GBIF, b = Bugguide.net

References

Further reading

 

Platypezidae
Articles created by Qbugbot
Platypezoidea genera